William Everett (October 10, 1839 – February 16, 1910) was born in Watertown, Massachusetts, United States.  He was the son of Charlotte Gray Brooks and orator, Massachusetts governor and U.S. Secretary of State Edward Everett, who spoke at Gettysburg, Pennsylvania, before President Abraham Lincoln's address on November 19, 1863.

He graduated from Harvard University in 1859, from Trinity College, Cambridge in 1863 and from Harvard University's law department in 1865. He was admitted to the bar in 1866 and was licensed to preach in 1872 by the Suffolk Association of Unitarian Ministers. He tutored at Harvard University from 1870 to 1873, then was promoted to assistant professor of Latin, a position he held till 1877. He became master of Adams Academy in 1878.

Everett left Adams Academy in 1893 and was elected to the Fifty-third United States Congress as a Democrat representing Massachusetts's seventh district. He then followed in his father's footsteps by running for Governor of Massachusetts. However, he lost the election to the incumbent Roger Wolcott.

Everett returned to his job as master of Adams Academy in 1897. He died on February 16, 1910, and was interred with his parents in Mount Auburn Cemetery in Cambridge, Massachusetts.

References

External links

 

1839 births
1910 deaths
Alumni of Trinity College, Cambridge
Burials at Mount Auburn Cemetery
Harvard Law School alumni
Harvard University faculty
Massachusetts lawyers
Democratic Party members of the United States House of Representatives from Massachusetts
19th-century American politicians
19th-century American lawyers